Bella Taylor Smith is an Australian singer. In 2021, Taylor Smith took part in the 10th season of The Voice Australia, winning the title in September 2021 and collecting $100,000 prize money and a recording contract with EMI Music Australia.

Career

2021: The Voice season 10

In 2021, Taylor Smith auditioned for season 10 of The Voice Australia with the song "Ave Maria". All four judges turned for her blind audition and she chose Team Guy Sebastian. The grand final was broadcast on 12 September 2021 with Taylor Smith  being decided by a viewer poll.

 denotes winner.

After receiving the news from host Sonia Kruger, Taylor Smith said "I really can't believe it. I'm so thankful. I can't wait to see what incredible things are ahead for me. I'm really grateful for you [coach Guy], for everyone who voted and for my beautiful family who I love.

Immediately following the announcement of her win, Taylor Smith's debut EP with EMI Music The Complete Collection was released.

2022: Look Me in the Eye
On 28 January 2022, Taylor Smith released "Nice to Know Ya". Upon release she said "We all process broken trust differently. Whether it's between family, friends or romantic partners – each of us are likely to respond in our own unique way. 'Nice to Know Ya explores differing journeys/ choices the listener may face in deciding the best way forward from that moment of broken trust. If you want to continue to make something work knowing it won't be easy, or if you want to turn around and say 'nice to know ya', no choice is bad, it's just what's right for you."

On 18 March 2022, Taylor Smith released "Look Me in the Eyes", the title track from her forthcoming extended play.

Personal life
In the pre-audition interview of The Voice, Taylor Smith discussed her background in the church and said "I never really knew why I could sing or what I was going to do with it until I started going to church." She later said "faith is a really important part of my life."

Discography
Extended plays

Singles

Awards and nominations
ARIA Music Awards
The ARIA Music Awards is an annual awards ceremony that recognises excellence, innovation, and achievement across all genres of Australian music. They commenced in 1987. 

! 
|-
| rowspan="1"| 2022
| rowspan="1"| Look Me in the Eyes''
| Michael Gudinski Breakthrough Artist
| 
| rowspan="1"| 
|-

References

External links
 

21st-century Australian musicians
21st-century Australian singers
21st-century Australian women singers
Australian Christians
Australian women singer-songwriters
Australian singer-songwriters
Australian singers by state or territory
Australian women composers
Australian women pop singers
EMI Music Australia artists
Living people
The Voice (Australian TV series) contestants
The Voice (franchise) winners
Year of birth missing (living people)